Ntala Skinner (born 22 February 1973) is a retired American biathlete from Sun Valley, Idaho. She competed for the United States at the 1998 Winter Olympics. In 1993 she was the only junior team member to make the U.S. squad for the 1993 Worlds.

References 

1973 births
Living people
American female biathletes
Olympic biathletes of the United States
Biathletes at the 1998 Winter Olympics
People from Sun Valley, Idaho
21st-century American women
U.S. Army World Class Athlete Program